Blackhead Lighthouse is a listed lighthouse built at the turn of the 20th century, near Whitehead in County Antrim, Northern Ireland. It marks the very northern end of Belfast Lough where it opens out into the North Channel that separates Northern Ireland and Scotland.
The active lighthouse is managed by the Commissioners of Irish Lights, where it is named as the Blackhead Antrim Lighthouse to distinguish it from the more modern Blackhead lighthouse in County Clare.

History 
The first application for a lighthouse at Black Head was made by the Belfast Harbour Board in 1893. It was refused by the Commissioners of Irish Lights on the basis that the light would only benefit shipping entering Belfast and should not be financed by the general Mercantile Marine Fund. A second request was made in early 1898, this time supported by Lloyd's and the Belfast Chamber of Commerce as well as the Harbour Board, it was also refused. Further representations were made that year, including discussions in the House of Commons, until the Board of Trade and Trinity House agreed to make available funding to cover the estimated cost of £10,025 (equivalent to £ as of ) for the construction of a lighthouse and fog signal.

The contract to construct the light was awarded to William Campbell and Sons in 1899 with work starting the same year. Designed by William Douglass engineer-in-chief to the CIL, the lighthouse was completed in 1902. Situated at the top of a steep cliff to guide ships into Belfast Lough and the port of Belfast, it complements the Mew Island Lighthouse on the southern side of the lough entrance, which was also designed by Douglass.

The main two-storey keeper's house is built close by and linked to the tower by an enclosed walkway. There is also an adjacent detached superintendent's house. The lighthouse was electrified in 1965 and became automatic in 1975. The fog signal was suppressed in 1972.

Blackhead is one of the dozen lighthouses that make up the "Great Lighthouses of Ireland", a tourism initiative designed to promote the use of certain lighthouses for holiday accommodation. 
The keeper's houses at the lighthouse were refurbished by the Irish Landmark Trust, and are now offered as holiday accommodation. They retain the original whistle pipes that were used to call the off-duty keeper's to their watch duties.

Coastal path
The lighthouse is accessible by a narrow private road (only accessible by foot for the general public) about 4 km north-east of Whitehead, and also by foot along the Blackhead Path from the town. This walkway was developed by Berkeley Deane Wise, to help attract tourists to the town, and loops around the headland requiring bridges and two tunnels. It was the precursor to the more dramatic Gobbins path, a few miles further north along the coast.

Listed buildings
The entire lighthouse complex including the tower and keeper's houses is protected as a category B+ listed building.

See also

 List of lighthouses in Ireland

References

External links

  Commissioners of Irish Lights

Lighthouses in Northern Ireland
Buildings and structures in County Antrim
Lighthouses completed in 1902
Grade B+ listed buildings
Listed lighthouses in Northern Ireland
1902 establishments in Ireland